Paraperipatus keiensis is a species of velvet worm in the Peripatopsidae family. This species is green-black with yellow-brown spots. Females of this species have 24 or 25 pairs of legs; males have 22 or 23. Females range from 27 mm to 48 mm in length, whereas males range from 25 mm to 33 mm. The type locality is in Kai Besar, Indonesia.

References

Onychophorans of Australasia
Onychophoran species
Animals described in 1923